Sadie may refer to:

People

Women 
 Sadie Tanner Mossell Alexander (1898–1989), first African-American woman to earn a Ph.D. in the United States and to practice law in Pennsylvania
 Sadie Benning (born 1973), American video maker, visual artist and musician
 Sadie Bjornsen (born 1989), American cross-country skier
 Sadie Bonnell (1888–1993), British ambulance driver and winner of the Military Medal
 Sadie Coles (born 1963), British art dealer
 Sadie Peterson Delaney (1889–1958), American librarian who pioneered bibliotherapy
 Sarah Louise Delany (1889–1999), American author, educator and civil rights pioneer
 Josephine Earp (1860–1944), common-law wife of American Old West lawman Wyatt Earp
 Sadie Farrell (fl. 1869), American criminal, gang leader and river pirate also known as "Sadie the Goat"
 Sadie Frost (born 1965), English actress, producer and fashion designer
 Sarah Sadie Irvine (1885–1970), American artist and educator
 Sadie Jones (born 1967), English writer and novelist
 Elizabeth Holloway Marston (1893–1993), American psychologist, born Sadie Holloway 
 Sadie Miller (born 1985), English actress
 Sadie Kneller Miller (1867–1920), early American woman sports journalist
 Sadie Grant Pack (1877–1960), first counselor in the general presidency of the Primary of The Church of Jesus Christ of Latter-day Saints
 Sadie Plant (born 1964), British philosopher, cultural theorist and author
 Sadie Robertson (born 1997), Duck Dynasty reality television star
 Sadie Sink (born 2002), American actress
 Sarah Williams (poet) (1837–1868), English poet

Men 
 Sargent Perry Sadie Houck (1856–1919), American Major League Baseball player
 John Joseph Sadie McMahon (1867–1954), American Major League Baseball pitcher

Surnames 
 Eben Sadie, winemaker of South African wine producer The Sadie Family
 Johann Sadie (born 1989), South African rugby union player
 Stanley Sadie (1930–2005), British musicologist

Fictional characters 
 Sadie, from the Canadian animated series Total Drama
 Sadie Adler, a supporting character in the 2018 video game Red Dead Redemption 2
 Sadie Gray, in the US television series One Life to Live
 Sadie Harris, in the US television series Grey's Anatomy
 Sadie Hawkins (disambiguation), multiple characters
 Sadie Hawthorne, in the Canadian television series Naturally, Sadie
 Sadie Jackson, the main character in Joan Lingard's novels The Twelfth Day of July and Across the Barricades
 Sadie Kane, a main character in the book series The Kane Chronicles
 Sadie King, in the UK television series Emmerdale
 Sadie Lloyd, in the UK television series Family Affair
 Sadie McKee, the title character in 1934 film of same name
 Sadie Miller, a supporting character on the Cartoon Network show Steven Universe
 Sadie Parker Knickerhaus Doyle, in the staged radio production "The Thrilling Adventure Hour"
 Sadie Stone, in the UK television series EastEnders
 Sadie Thompson (disambiguation), main character from the short story "Rain" by W. Somerset Maugham and its adaptations

Music 
 Sadie (band), a Japanese rock band
 "Sadie" (Alkaline Trio song), a song on the album Crimson by Alkaline Trio
 "Sadie", a song by Hound Dog Taylor and The Houserockers
 "Sadie", a song by Joanna Newsom on the album The Milk-Eyed Mender
 "Sadie" (song), a song by The Spinners
 "Sexy Sadie" (song), a song by The Beatles
 Sadie, a 1968 album by Johnny Farnham
 "Sadie" (The Cleaning Lady), a song from the album

Other uses 
 Sadie (book), 2018 novel by Courtney Summers
 Sadie (dog), a Laborador Retriever that received the Dickin Medal in 2007
 Sadie (film), an American drama film
 Sadie (given name)

See also 
 Sadie Thompson (disambiguation)
 
 Sadies, a genus of spiders
 Sexy Sadie (disambiguation)
 Sady (disambiguation)

Lists of people by nickname
English-language feminine given names
English feminine given names